USS Wenatchee (ATF-118) was an  during the World War II. Her namesake was a tribe of Indians of the Salishan language group, who lived in the area that is now central Washington state, principally around Lake Chelan.

Design and description

The ship's complement consisted of 85 officers and ratings.

The ship had two General Motors 12-278A diesel engines, one shaft.

The Abnaki class was armed with a 3"/50 caliber gun anti-aircraft gun, two single-mount Oerlikon 20 mm cannon and two twin-gun mounts for Bofors 40 mm gun.

Construction and career
The ship was built at the United Engineering Co. at Alameda, California. She was laid down on 12 January 1944 and launched on 7 September 1944. The ship was commissioned on 24 March 1945. She was re-designated as ATF-118 on 15 May 1944.

Wenatchee conducted her shakedown training in the San Pedro-San Diego-San Francisco area, before departing the west coast on 15 May, bound for the Hawaiian Islands. Reaching Pearl Harbor on 30 May, the fleet tug remained there through mid-June and then sailed for the Marshalls. She reached Eniwetok on 5 July.

The fleet tug performed ocean towing and screening duties supporting the 3rd Fleet's drive against the Japanese homeland and, after hostilities ended, participated in the initial occupation of Japan. She was present in Tokyo Bay on 2 September, the day of Japan's formal surrender. That autumn, she engaged in salvage work at the former Japanese naval base at Yokosuka.

Wenatchee operated there through the end of 1945 and into the following year, finally departing that port in company with Conserver (ARS-39) on 20 February 1946, bound for Hawaiian waters. Reaching Pearl Harbor on 3 March, Wenatchee stayed there for over a month before she sailed for Bikini Atoll on 13 April to take part in Operation Crossroads.

As part of Task Unit 1.8.1, a repair and service unit, Wenatchee supported the atomic test operations there into the summer and then left Kwajalein on 20 August and headed for Pearl Harbor, reaching that port on 5 September. The fleet tug subsequently towed AFDB-7 from Pearl Harbor to San Francisco, reaching the west coast in late October.

After transiting the Panama Canal in mid-December and reporting for duty with Service Force, Atlantic Fleet, Wenatchee reached New Orleans on 21 January 1947. Shifting to Orange, Texas, in mid-March, the fleet tug was decommissioned and placed in reserve there on 19 May 1947.

Struck from the Navy list on 1 September 1962, the ship was transferred to the Maritime Administration for lay up and preservation. Berthed at Beaumont, Texas, she remained there into the late 1970s, awaiting final disposition.

Awards 
The ship earned 1 battle star throughout her career.
 China Service Medal 
 American Campaign Medal 
 Asiatic-Pacific Campaign Medal (1 battle star) 
 World War II Victory Medal 
 Navy Occupation Service Medal (with Asia clasp) 
 Philippines Liberation Medal

References

External links
NavSource Online: USS Wenatchee (ATF-118)
Hull Number : ATF-118 DEPLOYMENTS - MAJOR EVENTS

Tolowa
Ships built in Alameda, California
1944 ships
World War II auxiliary ships of the United States